In a Monastery Garden is a celebrated piece of music by Albert Ketèlbey.  It may also refer to

In a Monastery Garden (film), a 1935 British film directed by Maurice Elvey
In a Monastery Garden, a BBC Radio 4 gardening programme presented by Nigel Colborn
"In a Monastery Garden", an episode of the British TV series Rosemary & Thyme